Stade Municipal is a multi-use stadium in Sansanne Mango, Togo.  It is currently used mostly for football matches and is the home stadium of Abou Ossé F.C.  The stadium holds 1,500 people.

Municipal